Umm Al Hassam (trans. Mother of Sea Shells) is a middle-class neighbourhood on the southern coast of Manama, which is the capital of Bahrain. The neighborhood is home to the majority of Bahrain's local Jewish community. It consists of a mixture of grand villas and newer apartment buildings, and is well known for its Lebanese and Indian restaurants.

Abdulaziz Shamlan, a Bahraini nationalist leader from the 1950s and later Bahrain's Ambassador in Cairo, is one of the area's most famous ex-residents, along with the late Yousuf Abdulrahman Engineer whose house symbolizes tradition. Umm Al Hassam maintains its leftist traditions with the large headquarters for the National Democratic Action situated there.

References

Jewish communities
Neighborhoods of Manama
Populated coastal places in Bahrain

Jews and Judaism in Bahrain